Argentina has a number of national symbols, some of which are extensively defined by law.

List of symbols

References